Peter Anthony Freeman is a Welsh author, politician and storyteller.

Career
Freeman was heavily involved with the Welsh community in Los Angeles where he was President of the Welsh League of Southern California, won the Los Angeles Eisteddfod Honorary Recognition for Bardic Achievements in 2013, and wrote several books on Welsh culture. Freeman also served as History and Mythology Editor of Celtic Family Magazine from 2013 to 2015. In 2017 he was elected a council member for Plaid Cymru in Pembrey, Wales.

In April 2019, Freeman was elected and accepted the position of Mayor of Pembrey and Burry Port.

Personal life
Freeman was born in Llanelli, Wales and returned in retirement after living in Los Angeles, California. He currently is pursuing community engagement.

Bibliography
 The Children's Voice: A Definitive Collection of Welsh Nursery Rhymes (2012)
 Age of Saints (2013)

Provided Notation
 A Welsh Alphabet (2011), author Lorin Morgan-Richards, notes by Peter Anthony Freeman

References

Living people
Welsh-language writers
Welsh travel writers
21st-century Welsh historians
Year of birth missing (living people)